The 2018 Georgia House of Representatives elections took place as part of the biennial United States elections. Georgia voters elected state representatives in all 180 of the state house's districts. State representatives serve two-year terms in the Georgia House of Representatives.

A primary election on May 22, 2018 and a runoff election on July 24, 2018 in races where no candidate received more than 50% of the vote in the May primary determined which candidates appear on the November 6 general election ballot. Primary and runoff election results can be obtained from the Georgia Secretary of State's website. A statewide map of Georgia's state House districts can be obtained from the Georgia Legislative and Congressional Reapportionment Office here, and individual district maps can be obtained from the U.S. Census here.

Following the 2016 state House elections, Republicans maintained effective control of the House with 118 members. However, over the course of 2017 and 2018, Democrats flipped District 117 and District 119 in special elections. Due to these special election loses and vacancies caused by resignation, Republican seats decreased from 118 to 115 and Democratic seats increased from 62 to 64 by election day 2018.

To have claimed control of the chamber from Republicans, the Democrats would have needed to net 27 House seats.

Following the 2018 elections, Democrats received a net gain of 11 seats, winning 14 contests and increasing their margin to 75 seats. Republicans maintained their majority, but they still suffered a net loss of nine seats as opposed to 10 when taking into account that Republican Steven Sainz filled the vacancy in District 180. The Republican majority in the Georgia State House initially stood at 104 after the election, despite winning 105 seats, due to the death of Rep. John Meadows on Nov. 13, 2018. As a result, a special election was held, with Matt Barton winning the election, bringing the Republican seat total back up to 105.

Results

Summary of results by district
Data for the following table originates from the Georgia Secretary of State's website. The 2016 election results used to determine "Gain" or "Hold" for seats without intervening special elections:

Source:

Detailed Results by District

Sources:

District 1

District 2

District 3

District 4

District 5

District 6

District 7

District 8

District 9

District 10

District 11

District 12

District 13

District 14

District 15

District 16

District 17

District 18

District 19

District 20

District 21

District 22

District 23

District 24

District 25

District 26

District 27

District 28

District 29

District 30

District 31

District 32

District 33

District 34

District 35

District 36

District 37

District 38

District 39

District 40

District 41

District 42

District 43

District 44

District 45

District 46

District 47

District 48

District 49

District 50

District 51

District 52

District 53

District 54

District 55

District 56

District 57

District 58

District 59

District 60

District 61

District 62

District 63

District 64

District 65

District 66

District 67

District 68

District 69

District 70

District 71

District 72

District 73

District 74

District 75

District 76

District 77

District 78

District 79

District 80

District 81

District 82

District 83

District 84

District 85

District 86

District 87

District 88

District 89

District 90

District 91

District 92

District 93

District 94

District 95

District 96

District 97

District 98

District 99

District 100

District 101

District 102

District 103

District 104

District 105

District 106

District 107

District 108

District 109

District 110

District 111

District 112

District 113

District 114

District 115

District 116

District 117

District 118

District 119

District 120

District 121

District 122

District 123

District 124

District 125

District 126

District 127

District 128

District 129

District 130

District 131

District 132

District 133

District 134

District 135

District 136

District 137

District 138

District 139

District 140

District 141

District 142

District 143

District 144

District 145

District 146

District 147

District 148

District 149

District 150

District 151

District 152

District 153

District 154

District 155

District 156

District 157

District 158

District 159

District 160

District 161

District 162

District 163

District 164

District 165

District 166

District 167

District 168

District 169

District 170

District 171

District 172

District 173

District 174

District 175

District 176

District 177

District 178

District 179

District 180

See also
 United States elections, 2018
 United States House of Representatives elections in Georgia, 2018
 Georgia elections, 2018
 Georgia gubernatorial election, 2018
 Georgia lieutenant gubernatorial election, 2018
 Georgia Secretary of State election, 2018
 Georgia State Senate election, 2018
 Elections in Georgia (U.S. state)

References

Notes

Citations

2018 Georgia (U.S. state) elections
Georgia House of Representatives elections
Georgia House of Representatives